Susan Alter Klaperman (born May 18, 1942) is an American politician who served in the New York City Council from 1978 to 1993. She was the first, and as yet only, Orthodox Jewish woman to serve on the council.

Alter-Klaperman did not succeed in her 1993 attempt to run for Public Advocate.

References

1942 births
Living people
New York City Council members
New York (state) Democrats
Women New York City Council members
21st-century American women